was a Japanese daimyō of the early Edo period.   Shigenori's daimyō family claimed descent from the Shibukawa branch of the Seiwa Genji.  The Itakura identified its clan origins in Mikawa Province, and the progeny of Katsuhige (1542–1624), including the descendants of his second son Shigemasa (1588–1638), were known as the elder branch of the clan.  Katsuhige was Shingeori's grandfather; and Shigenori was the eldest son of Shigemasa.

Shigenori's youth was spent in Mikawa province.  In 1615, Shigenori's father was granted yearly revenues from Mikawa in honor of his warrior conduct during the siege of Osaka.

Career of shogunate service
Shigenori was made governor of Osaka Castle and then rōjū.  His served for a time as rōjū (1665–1668), and then he left Edo for Kyoto.

He served as the shōgun's representative in the capital as the fourth Kyoto shoshidai in the period which spanned July 19, 1668 through April 3, 1670. He returned to Edo for a second term as rōjū (1670–1673). His service to the Tokugawa shogunate was serially rewarded in Fukōzu and Mikawa-Nakajima.  In 1672, he was made daimyō of Karasuyama in Shimotsuke Province.

His grandfather was the second shoshidai and his uncle was the third shoshidai. Shigenori followed their examples by joining his father as part of the shogunate's army during the Shimabara Rebellion.

Notes

References
 Meyer, Eva-Maria. (1999). Japans Kaiserhof in de Edo-Zeit: Unter besonderer Berücksichtigung der Jahre 1846 bis 1867. Münster: Tagenbuch. 
 Murdoch, James. (1996).  A History of Japan. London: Routledge.  
 Papinot, Edmond. (1906) Dictionnaire d'histoire et de géographie du japon. Tokyo: Librarie Sansaisha...Click link for digitized 1906 Nobiliaire du japon (2003)
 Sasaki Suguru. (2002). Boshin sensō: haisha no Meiji ishin. Tokyo: Chūōkōron-shinsha.
 Toby, Ronald P. (1991).  State and Diplomacy in Early Modern Japan: Asia in the Development of the Tokugawa Bakufu. Stanford: Stanford University Press. 
 Japanese Wikipedia article on Shigenori (26 Oct. 2007)

|-

|-

|-

Daimyo
Kyoto Shoshidai
Itakura clan
Rōjū
1617 births
1673 deaths